MLB 13: The Show is a Major League Baseball video game which was published by Sony Computer Entertainment and developed by San Diego Studio. The game was released in March 2013 for the PlayStation 3 and PlayStation Vita. It is the third installment of the series to be compatible with PlayStation Move. The play-by play is done once again by Matt Vasgersian and Eric Karros along with a new commentator, Steve Lyons.

The American cover features Andrew McCutchen of the Pittsburgh Pirates. José Bautista, of the Toronto Blue Jays is on the Canadian cover.

An expansion pack exclusive to PlayStation 3, called MLB 13: The Show - Home Run Derby, was released on July 2, 2013.

New Features
 Postseason mode, allowing players to play through a full MLB postseason, complete with realistic postseason atmosphere.
 New color commentator Steve Lyons joins broadcast booth, replacing Dave Campbell.
 Hitting enhancements, such as push/pull hitting trajectories engine
 Diamond Dynasty Improvements: new card types, designated hitter option
 Road To The Show (RTTS): new mode-specific presentation
 New player development and budgeting systems in Season and Franchise modes
 Fielding throwing meters

Online features
These features depended on the PlayStation Network

 Universal online profile
 Cross-platform online Home Run Derby
 The Show Live: allows players to play along with real-life MLB schedule with updated stats, rosters, and commentary.
 Online leagues overhaul: ability to play real schedule of all 30 MLB teams, and ability to control pace of league.
Road To The Show (RTTS): new RTTS online leaderboards
Challenge of the Week Real-time leaderboard

In August 2014, Sony announced they were shutting down the online servers, so people are no longer able to play online features, but the players can continue playing the offline features.

Reception

The game received "generally favorable reviews" on both platforms according to the review aggregation website Metacritic.

Sports Illustrated gave the PS3 version a score of nine out of ten and said that it was "consistently successful because it's loaded with options that allow you to play the brand of baseball you want, and at a skill level you can handle." Toronto Sun gave it a similar score of four-and-a-half stars out of five and said that it "pulls no squeeze plays on quality and realism when it comes to the game of baseball." The Digital Fix gave it a score of eight out of ten and said, "For those unfamiliar with baseball MLB 13: The Show is probably a curiosity at most. The fact that the game is also PlayStation exclusive further segregates its European audience so that it occupies a limited niche at best. Still, for those looking for a baseball game there is nothing better on the market."

Soundtrack

References

External links

Official site

2013 video games
Major League Baseball video games
North America-exclusive video games
PlayStation 3 games
PlayStation Move-compatible games
PlayStation Vita games
Video games set in Canada
Video games set in the United States
Sports video games with career mode
 13
Sony Interactive Entertainment games
Multiplayer and single-player video games
Video games developed in the United States
Video games set in Maryland
San Diego Studio games